Pathkiller, (died January 8, 1827) was a Cherokee warrior and Principal Chief of the Cherokee Nation.

Warrior life
Pathkiller fought against the Overmountain Men and American Wataugan frontiersmen settled in the Washington District at the outbreak of the American Revolutionary War. Afterward, he joined with Dragging Canoe and the Chickamauga Cherokee faction fighting in the Cherokee–American wars, until the conclusion of hostilities in 1794.

This Pathkiller may be the one who served as a colonel with the Tennessee militia and fought for Morgan's "Regiment of Cherokees" commanded by Colonel Gideon Morgan under Andrew Jackson, against the Red Stick Indian uprising during the Creek War (October 7, 1813 – April 11, 1814), a frontier extension of the War of 1812.

Cherokee national leader
Pathkiller was the last hereditary chief of the Cherokee. He was the Principal Chief of the Cherokee Nation (from 1811–1828).

A description of Cherokee Council sessions was given by the missionary, Ard Hoyt, on a visit to the seat of Cherokee government in October 1818:

After 1813, the de facto authority in the Cherokee Nation had shifted to Charles R. Hicks, who was the first chief of partial European descent.  Pathkiller remained chief in title only—basically as a figurehead—until his death on January 8, 1827.  Two weeks after Pathkiller's death, his successor, Charles Hicks, also died (on January 20, 1827), leaving a leadership vacuum that was filled in the interim by William, brother to Charles.  Pathkiller and the Hicks were mentors to John Ross, having identified the talented young mixed-blood Cherokee of Scots-Irish descent as the future leader of the Cherokee people.  After the tribe formed a constitutional republic, Ross was elected principal chief in October 1828.

Burial site
There is a monument-style table-tomb burial site for a Pathkiller (died 1827)—which was previously recorded in the region as a tomb of an "unknown Indian"—located in the present day Calhoun, Georgia area, at the site of the old Cherokee capital town of New Echota.

Notes

References

1749 births
1828 deaths
Chickamauga Cherokee
People from Cherokee County, Alabama
Native Americans in the American Revolution
Principal Chiefs of the Cherokee Nation (1794–1907)